Kings Cross railway station is located on the Eastern Suburbs line, serving the Sydney suburb of Kings Cross. It is served by Sydney Trains T4 Eastern Suburbs & Illawarra Line services and NSW TrainLink South Coast Line services.

History
Kings Cross station opened on 23 June 1979 when the Eastern Suburbs line opened from Central to Bondi Junction.

Platforms & services

Transport links
Transdev John Holland operate four via Kings Cross station:
200: Gore Hill to Bondi Junction station
311: Millers Point to Eddy Avenue
324: Walsh Bay to Watsons Bay via Old South Head Road
325: Walsh Bay to Watsons Bay via Vaucluse

Kings Cross station is served by one NightRide route:
N91: Bondi Junction station to Macquarie Park station

References

External links

 Kings Cross Station at Transport for New South Wales (Archived 1 May 2020)
Kings Cross Public Transport Map Transport for NSW

Easy Access railway stations in Sydney
Railway stations located underground in Sydney
Railway stations in Australia opened in 1979
Kings Cross, New South Wales
Eastern Suburbs railway line